Visions of Murder is a 1993 American made-for-television psychological thriller film directed by Michael Rhodes and starring Barbara Eden and James Brolin. The film was based on a teleplay written by Julie Moskowitz and Gary Stephens and was shot on location in San Francisco, California and San Jose, California. It premiered as a presentation of NBC Friday Night at the Movies on May 7, 1993.

The film was followed by a 1994 sequel, Eyes of Terror, also starring Barbara Eden.

Plot summary
Dr. Jesse Newman (Barbara Eden) is a San Francisco psychologist caught in a terrifying web of suspicion and intrigue when one of her patients is found murdered and suddenly begins to experience paranormal visions. Frightened and confused by her premonitions, Jesse recognizes a missing woman on the news but is still unsure of her newly developed abilities. Believing that she has witnessed a murder, she attempts to convince a skeptical police department. Dangerously entangled in these mysterious events, Jesse becomes the prime suspect and, possibly, the next victim.

Cast
 Barbara Eden as Dr. Jesse Newman
 James Brolin as Hal (Jesse's ex-husband)
 Joan Pringle as Gwen
 Scott Bryce as Lt. Sayles
 Erika Flores as Kimberly
 Anita Finlay as Gloria
 Terry O'Quinn as Admiral Truman Hager
 Jason Keogh as The Bartender

Home media
Visions of Murder was released twice on Region 1 DVD on December 23, 2003 by Madacy Entertainment and July 6, 2010 by Echo Bridge Entertainment.
Release parties were held for both DVD releases in Campbell, California at the bar featured in the production.

References

External links

1993 television films
1993 films
1990s psychological thriller films
American psychological thriller films
NBC network original films
1990s English-language films
Films set in San Francisco
Films scored by Michael Hoenig
1990s American films